South Levantine Arabic is a subdivision of Levantine Arabic. It is spoken in the Southern Levant, mostly the Palestinian Territories (the West Bank, including East Jerusalem, and the Gaza Strip) and Israel, as well as in most of Jordan (in the ‘Ajlun, Al Balqa’, Al Karak, Al Mafraq, ‘Amman, Irbid, Jarash, and Madaba governorates). It is also spoken in Southern Syria, particularly in the Hauran region of Daraa Governorate. South Levantine Arabic is further subdivided in Jordanian Arabic and Palestinian Arabic.

References